The .500/450 No 1 Black Powder Express, known in its day as the .500/450 No 1 Express, was a centerfire rifle cartridge developed by Westley Richards and introduced in the late 1870s.

Overview
The .500/450 No 1 Black Powder Express was a rimmed, bottlenecked cartridge designed for use with black powder. The cartridge was originally designed as a deer stalking round with a  bullet, although later a  loading was produced for target shooting.

The .500/450 No 1 Nitro for Black was the same cartridge loaded with mild loadings of cordite, carefully balanced to replicate the ballistics of the black powder version.  Unlike other similar black powder cartridges, such as the .450 Black Powder Express and .500/450 Magnum Black Powder Express, the .500/450 No 1 Express never became a Nitro Express cartridge.

See also
 Express (weaponry)
 List of rifle cartridges
 11 mm caliber other cartridges of similar caliber size.

References

External links
 Ammo-One, "500/450 No.1", ammo-one.com, retrieved 20 October 2017.
 Cartridgecollector, ".500/450 No. 1 Express", cartridgecollector.net, retrieved 20 October 2017.
 The Spanish Association of Cartridge Collectors, ".500-.450 No 1 Express / .500-.450 No 1 Express " / .500-.450 No 1 Fraser Express ", municion.org , retrieved 20 October 2017.

Pistol and rifle cartridges
British firearm cartridges
Westley Richards cartridges